Leśna  is a town in Lubań County, Lower Silesian Voivodeship, in south-western Poland, close to the Czech border. It is the seat of the administrative district (gmina) called Gmina Leśna. As of 2019, the town has a population of 4,439.

Geography
The town is situated north of the Jizera Mountains on the left banks of the Kwisa River, the eastern edge of the historic Upper Lusatia region. In the south, a border crossing leads to Jindřichovice pod Smrkem in Bohemia.

Lake Leśnia, a reservoir of the Kwisa River, is located east of the town.

History
King Wenceslaus I of Bohemia, then ruler of the Upper Lusatian lands, ceded it to the Meissen bishop Conrad I of Wallhausen. The fortress probably lost its strategic importance with the construction of Czocha Castle further east in the early 14th century. 

The Lissa settlement is documented in 1329. It may have been a founding of the Silesian Duke Henry I of Jawor, heir of the Upper Lusatian Kwisa District by his mother Beatrice of Brandenburg. Upon Henry's death in 1346, the Kwisa lands reverted to the Bohemian Crown, whereafter the lordship was enfeoffed to local noble dynasties. A first town layout was abandoned in 1434 upon devastations by the Hussite Wars, a flood and a fire, and rebuilt at its present location further south on the route from Frýdlant to Lubań. A centre of cloth manufacturing, it received market rights in 1515.

The name Marklissa first appeared in 1574. Upon the 1635 Peace of Prague it fell with Upper Lusatia to the Electorate of Saxony. The town's economy was boosted by the immigration of Protestants fleeing from the Counter-Reformation in the adjacent Habsburg lands of Bohemia and Silesia. After the Napoleonic Wars and the 1815 Congress of Vienna, southeastern Upper Lusatia was annexed by Prussia and incorporated into the Province of Silesia.

With Prussia Marklissa became part of the German Empire in 1871. After World War II the town, located east of the Oder-Neisse line, was ceded to the Republic of Poland according to the 1945 Potsdam Agreement. The German population was expelled and the area resettled with Poles deported from the eastern Kresy borderlands.

Twin towns – sister cities
See twin towns of Gmina Leśna.

References

External links
 Town and Gmina official site 

Cities and towns in Lower Silesian Voivodeship
Lubań County
Cities in Silesia